Autodesk Inventor is a computer-aided design application for 3D mechanical design, simulation, visualization, and documentation developed by Autodesk.

Features 
Inventor allows 2D and 3D data integration in a single environment, creating a virtual representation of the final product that enables users to validate the form, fit, and function of the product before it is ever built. Autodesk Inventor includes parametric, direct edit and freeform modeling tools as well as multi-CAD translation capabilities and in their standard DWG drawings. Inventor uses ShapeManager, Autodesk's proprietary geometric modeling kernel. Autodesk Inventor competes directly with SolidWorks, Solid Edge, and Creo.

Editions 
The latest Autodesk Inventor product line includes the following software titles:

Autodesk Inventor LT 2021 (discontinued)
Autodesk Inventor Professional 2023

Release dates and names

See also 
 Comparison of CAD editors for architecture, engineering and construction (AEC)
 Creo
 Solid Edge
 SolidWorks

References

External links 

 Autodesk Inventor official website
 Autodesk Inventor Forums
 Autodesk Inventor Blog
 Autodesk Education Community
 GrabCAD - Upload, Download, and View Inventor files

Autodesk products
Computer-aided design software for Windows
1999 software
3D printing